Qabtar Qoluy, also rendered as Qabtaqolu or Qabtar Qolu, also known as Eyshum or Qeydar Qalu, may refer to:
 Qabtar Qoluy-e Olya
 Qabtar Qoluy-e Sofla